Echinolittorina meleagris is a species of small sea snail, a marine gastropod mollusk in the family Littorinidae, the winkles or periwinkles.

Description 
The shell is oval and turritelada, much higher than wide, moderately thick and opaque, features 5 or 6 turns that increase rapidly in size and are convex with sutures well marked. The buelta body is 2/3 of the total height of the shell. The color pattern typicamente spotted large white spots separated by stripes mahogany very narrow or can be brown. The maximum recorded shell length is 10 mm.

Distribution
The distribution of Echinolittorina meleagris, covers all Coast Caribbean, having been appointed in the Lesser Antilles, Belize, Colombia, Costa Rica, Cuba, Gulf of Mexico, Cayman Islands, Jamaica, Mexico, Panama, Puerto Rico and Venezuela.

Habitat 
It is a typical inhabitant of rocky coastline, which is located where the surf zone is usually large patch of hundreds of individuals. Minimum recorded depth is -1 m. Maximum recorded depth is 0 m.

References

External links
 World Register of Marine Species (Worms): Littorina meleagris (Potiez & Michaud, 1838) AphiaID: 156217
 Integrated Taxonomic Information System (ITIS): Littorina meleagris  (Potiez and Michaud, 1838) Taxonomic Serial No.: 70433
 Boldsystem: Echinolittorina meleagris {species}
 National Center for Biotechnology Information (NCBI): Echinolittorina meleagris Taxonomy ID: 196956
 Biodiversity Heritage Library (BHL): Bibliography for Littorina meleagris

Littorinidae
Gastropods described in 1838